The Iowa Wing of Civil Air Patrol (CAP) is the highest echelon of Civil Air Patrol in the state of Iowa and is part of CAP's North Central Region. The Iowa Wing headquarters is located in West Des Moines, Iowa. The Iowa Wing consists of over 360 cadet and adult members at 9 locations across the state of Iowa. They operate a total of 7 single-engine aircraft and 1 glider, which flew a total of 975 flight hours in 2022.

Mission
The Iowa Wing performs the three missions of Civil Air Patrol: providing emergency services; providing a cadet program for youth; and offering aerospace education for both CAP members and the general public.

Emergency services

Civil Air Patrol conducts emergency service missions, including: inland search and rescue missions, disaster relief missions including aerial surveillance missions, and air evacuation of the sick and injured. Civil Air Patrol maintains a network of radio stations to maintain communications during an emergency. Civil Air Patrol has also conducted homeland security missions by providing airborne reconnaissance of critical infrastructure.

Notable Emergency Services Missions

In June 1942, a squadron located in Sioux City, Iowa warned local residents of a coming flood, due to rising waters in the Missouri River, by painting "FLOOD" on the bottom of their aircraft and flying overhead.

In June 2008, the Iowa Wing provided aerial surveillance in the aftermath of the Iowa flood of 2008, where 80 of Iowa's 99 counties were federally declared disaster areas due to the extent of the damage. The Iowa Wing conducted 16 sorties, totaling 31.6 flight hours, supporting the Iowa Department of Homeland Security and Emergency Management Division and the National Weather Service. The Wing gathered approximately 1,800 aerial photographs of the damage caused by the flood. They notably flew then-Iowa U.S. Senator Tom Harkin (D) and Iowa U.S. Senator Chuck Grassley (R) on survey missions over: Ankeny, Mason City, Charles City, Nashua, Waverly, and Des Moines. Then-Iowa U.S. Representative Steve King (R) also participated in a CAP aerial survey mission with the Iowa Wing.

In August 2020, the Iowa Wing provided aerial surveillance in the aftermath of the August 2020 Midwest derecho. The derecho severely damaged several parts of Iowa, most notably Cedar Rapids. Starting on 14 August, over the course of 36 hours, the CAP Wings of: Iowa, Kansas, and Illinois conducted 37 sorties and gathered approximately 3,500 aerial photographs of the damage caused by the derecho.

In March 2022, the Iowa Wing provided disaster relief in the aftermath of an EF-4 tornado touching down in Madison County, Iowa. Iowa Governor Kim Reynolds issued a state disaster declaration for Madison County. 
The disaster resulted in 6 deaths and was the costliest tornado in the United States in 2022, with $220 million in damages.

In May 2022, the Iowa Wing, along with the Michigan Wing, Missouri Wing, and Minnesota Wing, took part in a wing-wide search and rescue exercise (SAREX) at Iowa City Airport. The exercise involved aircrew, ground teams, and drone teams and was conducted in conjunction with the Johnson County emergency management director.

In December 2022, the Iowa Wing was recognized for its participation in Operation Pulse Lift, CAP's humanitarian blood-donation mission in twelve states; launched to assist the American Red Cross in response to the COVID-19 pandemic. By 13 December 2022, Operation Pulse Lift had lasted 1,000 days and had resulted in the collection and transport of 17,416 units of blood by CAP.

Cadet programs
Civil Air Patrol offers a cadet program which provides leadership training, technical education, scholarships and career education to youth aged 12 to 21. The program includes CAP encampments and access to glider and powered aircraft flights. The Iowa Wing encampment is generally held in the summer at Camp Dodge in Johnston. The North Central Region Encampment has also historically been held at Camp Dodge.

Iowa Wing cadets also participate in National Wreaths Across America Day, an annual nationwide event in December for placing wreaths on veteran's graves in military cemeteries.

Notable Iowa Wing Cadet Program Accomplishments

In December 2021, the Osage Flight of the Iowa Wing won the All Divisions 1st Place State Award, Gold Tier, in the 14th National Cyber Patriot Competition, a cyber defense competition held annually by the Air & Space Forces Association where the Civil Air Patrol, Junior Reserve Officer Training Corps, and United States Naval Sea Cadet Corps compete.

Aerospace education
Civil Air Patrol provides aerospace education to both its members and the general public. Teachers may receive educational materials through the CAP's Aerospace Education Membership program.

History

World War Two
The Iowa Wing was established on 1 December 1941, as part of the newly formed Civil Air Patrol. Six days later, after the Attack on Pearl Harbor, it was called into service to support the home-front following the start of American involvement in World War Two. By 27 January 1942, the Iowa Wing had 575 members.

Missions involved surveying fields in Iowa for abandoned tractors and scrap piles that could be repurposed, along with simulating bombing runs on maneuvering ground troops using quarter pound bags of flour with the then-active Iowa State Guard. Scrap survey missions also involved letter dropping campaigns in order to garner local support and donations of scrap, which are noted in historical documents to have had considerably positive results in Iowa. Simulations of bombing runs using bags of flour are also noted to have drawn large crowds of spectating locals.

The Iowa Wing was also involved in anti-saboteur exercises for local authorities. This included conducting air interception drills, red teaming, and assisting authorities with inspections on explosives storage.

Organization
The Iowa Wing does not utilize CAP's optional "Group" structure. Instead, all squadrons report to the Iowa Wing directly.

Former Units 
Charter numbers were not assigned to squadrons in CAP until 1955. Prior to 1955, units used numbers based on Region, Wing, and Group. Iowa was the second Wing under the seventh Region. Groups were the third number and squadrons were assigned a number after the hyphen. Flights did not receive their own unit numbers. Instead, flights acted as detachments of squadrons who held unit numbers. Squadrons sometimes moved locations without changing their unit number. Other times, unit numbers were reused following a previous unit with the same squadron number being deactivated. Some of these units may have continued under different names after being assigned individual charter numbers after 1955.

Accidents
On March 13, 1971, A Civil Air Patrol Beechcraft A45 with the tail code N9716Z, assigned to the Iowa Wing, clipped a power-line and crashed while conducting flood surveillance over Boone, Iowa. Investigations found that the pilot-in-command had attempted operation with known deficiencies in equipment. The pilot, then-Iowa Wing Acting Commander Lt Col Robert A. Graybill, and an unidentified passenger were both fatally injured in the crash.

On March 22, 2003, a Civil Air Patrol Cessna 182R with the tail code N6211E, assigned to the Iowa Wing, was destroyed during takeoff and climb out from White Pigeon Airport (ICAO 7IA1) in near North English, Iowa. The aircraft was on an instructional training flight that started at Ankeny Regional Airport, manned by Certified Flight Instructor Major Christie Battle and Second Lieutenant James Johnson. The National Transportation Safety Board reported the cause of the accident was determined to be the pilot's failure to maintain adequate airspeed which resulted in a stall. The instructor's improper decision to attempt to takeoff from a short, grass taxiway instead of departing from a proper runway aligned with the prevailing winds; the short, grass taxiway itself; the crosswind, trees, and transmission wires all contributed to the accident. Maj Battle was fatally injured, while 2nd Lt Johnson sustained serious injuries.

Legal protection
Under Title I §29A.43 of the Code of Iowa, employers in Iowa are required to grant a leave of absence to their employees who are members of Civil Air Patrol when these employees are called to fulfill a Civil Air Patrol mission. Employers are forbidden by state law from punishing an employee in any way for being a member of Civil Air Patrol or for taking a leave of absence for a Civil Air Patrol mission. Employers cannot require their employee to use vacation time or sick leave to cover the employee's leave of absence, and may not reduce the employee's bonus or other employment benefits relating to the employee's particular employment.

List of commanders 
The Iowa Wing has had 31 wing commanders from 1941 to 2022.

See also
Iowa Air National Guard
Iowa Army National Guard
United States Coast Guard Auxiliary

References

External links
Iowa Wing Civil Air Patrol official website
Iowa Wing Civil Air Patrol Facebook Page

Wings of the Civil Air Patrol
Education in Iowa
Military in Iowa